The Waipaoa River is a river of the northeast of New Zealand's North Island. For about half of this distance its valley is followed by State Highway 2. The river has several important tributaries, among them the Wharekopai, Waikohu, Mangatu, Waingaromia and Waihora rivers. Major settlements along the banks of the river include Te Karaka, Ormond, and Patutahi.

References
 http://www.teara.govt.nz/en/1966/waipaoa-river/1

Rivers of the Gisborne District
Rivers of New Zealand